Michigan's 11th congressional district is a United States congressional district north of Detroit, comprising most of urbanized central Oakland County. Until 1993, the district covered the state's Upper Peninsula and the northernmost portion of the Lower Peninsula (a.k.a. Northern Michigan). In redistricting that year, it was shifted to the outer Detroit area. Its former geographical area is now the state's first district. Its current configuration dates from 2023.

The 11th district was represented by Thad McCotter from 2003 until his resignation on July 6, 2012. He was replaced by Democrat David Curson, who won a special election on November 6, 2012. Curson was sworn in on November 13. He was replaced by Kerry Bentivolio in January 2013, who had been elected in the regular fall election in 2012. David Trott was elected in 2014 after defeating Bentivolio in the Republican primary, and took office in January 2015. He did not seek reelection in 2018. Democrat Haley Stevens was elected on November 6, 2018, and is the current representative for the eleventh district.

History
The 11th congressional district formed in 1993 was given portions of the old 15th (mainly Westland), 2nd (Livonia), 17th (the included portion of Southfield), 6th (Highland and White Lake Townships), and 18th congressional districts. Most of its territory came from the old 18th congressional district.

In 2003, the district was essentially split in two. The bulk of the district–most of the Oakland County portion–became the 9th district, while a new 11th was created mostly out of the Wayne County portion of the old 11th, combined with a sliver of Oakland.

In 2023, the district was consolidated to include only the urbanized south-central section of Oakland County.

Politics
The area that the 11th now covers has historically been strongly Republican. In the 1990s it became a swing district, with a slight Republican lean. Since the 2010's, the district is now considered to lean Democratic.

Cities since 2023

Auburn Hills
Berkley
Birmingham
Bloomfield Hills
Bloomfield Township
Clawson
Commerce Township
Farmington
Farmington Hills
Ferndale
Hazel Park
Huntington Woods
Keego Harbor
Lake Angelus
Madison Heights
Novi (portions)
Oak Park
Orchard Lake Village
Pleasant Ridge
Pontiac
Royal Oak
Royal Oak Township
Sylvan Lake
Troy
Walled Lake
Waterford Township
West Bloomfield Township
White Lake Township (portions)
Wixom

Voting

List of members representing the district

Recent election results

2012

2014

2016

2018

2020

2022

Historical district boundaries

See also
Michigan's congressional districts
List of United States congressional districts

Notes

References
U.S. Representatives 1837-2003, Michigan Manual 2003-2004

 Congressional Biographical Directory of the United States 1774–present

11
Constituencies established in 1883
1883 establishments in Michigan